Pink-slime journalism is a practice in which dedicated news outlets publish poor-quality news reports which appear to be local news, often to push both left-wing and right-wing agendas and gather user data. The reports are either computer-generated or written by poorly-paid outsourced writers, often using fake names. Many such networks have been linked to American conservative news businessman Brian Timpone. The term "pink-slime journalism" was coined by journalist Ryan Smith in 2012.

Overview 

Pink-slime journalism involves outsourcing local news stories to low-wage employees, or using computer automation to generate news stories from various datasets. The name is a reference to "pink slime", a meat by-product that is used as filler in processed meats, which are sometimes passed off as higher-quality meat in fast food restaurants.

With newspapers in decline over the past decade, dedicated pink-slime outlets have filled the voids left by shuttered local newspapers. Although many claim to be unbiased, many such outlets create and spread conservative political propaganda or disinformation, often during election cycles. According to Harvard University's Nieman Foundation for Journalism, although many such outlets claim to be independent, they are financed by "government officials, political candidates, PACs and political party operatives". The Columbia Journalism Review has reported that some of these outlets appear to be used to gather data from users for political targeting purposes.

According to the Columbia Journalism Review, pink-slime outlets attempt to exploit people's faith in local news, as well as capitalize on the information deserts created by declining local news. The Columbia Journalism Review identified around 450 websites that appeared to be pink-slime outlets in a December 2019 report; they reported in August 2020 that the number had almost tripled to more than 1,200 websites in the months preceding the 2020 United States presidential election.

In 2012, writers employed by a pink-slime network were being paid between $0.35 and $24 per article; the New York Times reported in October 2020 that journalists were being paid between $3 and $36 per article.

Examples 

Journatic, founded in 2006, produced hyperlocal news content and distributed it to other publishers. The company created its articles using a combination of computer generation and low-wage writers who were not local to the areas for which they were writing. Some of these writers were poorly-paid workers from outside of the United States who were writing under fake names. Newspapers throughout the United States including the Chicago Tribune, the San Francisco Chronicle, and the Houston Chronicle had all published journalism from Journatic. Journatic's practices were exposed in 2012 in a report by This American Life, which interviewed a journalist named Ryan Smith who had been working for Journatic, and who coined the term "pink-slime journalism". The exposé also revealed Journatic's use of false bylines, fabricated quotes, and plagiarized material. Newspapers canceled their contracts with Journatic following this revelation, including the Chicago Tribune, who had laid off employees and replaced their work with articles from Journatic. Journatic rebranded to Locality Labs the following year.

Brian Timpone, who was the chief executive of Journatic, is an American businessman who runs various pink-slime networks which contribute reports to over 1000 individual news websites. Research by the Columbia Journalism Review in December 2019 found that pink-slime networks operating hundreds of websites traced back to organizations connected to Timpone. One such organization, Metric Media, had set up 189 local news networks in ten states within a year. Other organizations included Locality Labs, Franklin Archer, the Record Inc., and Local Government Information Services; all were connected to Timpone in some way. Many of the articles distributed through these networks were right-leaning, and more than 90% of them were computer-generated or repurposed from other reports. According to the New York Times, the sites operated by Timpone's networks do not typically post false information, but "the operation is rooted in deception, eschewing hallmarks of news reporting like fairness and transparency". The sites typically do not disclose that they are funded by advocacy groups or that they are paid to run articles.

Conservative journalist Matthew Foldi has accused the left wing of producing pink-slime journalism, citing The American Independent and Courier Newsroom, which are associated with political operatives David Brock and Tara McGowan. NewsGuard reported in October 2022 that "operations such as Courier Newsroom, the American Independent and the Main Street Sentinel on the left" were "run[ning] ads on Facebook and Instagram while veiling their ties to partisan donors on the services". The Newsguard report referred to the newsrooms as "pink slime newsrooms".

See also 

 Content farm
 Hack writer

References

Further reading 
 
 
 

2012 neologisms
Disinformation operations
Internet manipulation and propaganda
Journalism terminology
News media manipulation